Hold with Hope is a peninsula in eastern Greenland. Administratively it is part of the Northeast Greenland National Park zone.

Geologically Hold with Hope is a place of great interest.

Geography
Hold with Hope is located between Loch Fyne in the west, Godthab Gulf in the NW, Gael Hamke Bay in the north, the Greenland Sea at its eastern end, and Mackenzie Bay and Foster Bay on its southern side.

The Spath Plateau, where the highest elevations are, is located in the northern part of the peninsula and the Tågefjeldene in the southern part. The Gauss Peninsula is located to the southwest, beyond the Badland Valley (Badlanddal). The section north of (Tobias Dal), a valley stretching from east to west across Hold with Hope, is also known as Home Foreland (Home Forland).

History 
This peninsula was reported by English sea explorer Henry Hudson during his 1607 and 1608 voyage on the Muscovy Company 80-ton whaler Hopewell of Hull. It was the first definite record of land in this remote area of Greenland. Hudson described the place as: 

The name is one of the oldest known geographical names in Northeastern Greenland. It appeared on an early 17th-century Dutch map by Jodocus Hondius as Holde with hope.

References

External links 
Petrogenesis of late stage magmatism at Hold with Hope, East Greenland
Tertiary volcanism in northern E Greenland: Gauss Halvø and Hold with Hope

Peninsulas of Greenland